Tomi Ståhlhammar (born March 9, 1988) is a Finnish professional ice hockey player who is currently playing for Espoon Blues in the SM-liiga.

External links

1988 births
Finnish ice hockey right wingers
Oulun Kärpät players
Living people
Sportspeople from Turku
Cedar Rapids RoughRiders players
Espoo Blues players